Ismael Alvariza (born 16 April 1897, date of death unknown) was a Brazilian footballer. He played in four matches for the Brazil national football team in 1920. He was also part of Brazil's squad for the 1920 South American Championship.

References

External links
 

1897 births
Year of death missing
Brazilian footballers
Brazil international footballers
Association football forwards
Grêmio Esportivo Brasil players
Guarani FC players